In statistics, the Matérn covariance, also called the Matérn kernel,  is a covariance function used in spatial statistics, geostatistics, machine learning, image analysis, and other applications of multivariate statistical analysis on metric spaces. It is named after the Swedish forestry statistician Bertil Matérn. It specifies the covariance between two measurements as a function of the distance between the points at which they are taken. Since the covariance only depends on distances between points, it is stationary. If the distance is Euclidean distance, the Matérn covariance is also isotropic.

Definition 
The Matérn covariance between measurements taken at two points separated by d distance units is given by 

A Gaussian process with Matérn covariance is  times differentiable in the mean-square sense.

Spectral density 

Explicitly, this is given by

Simplification for specific values of ν

Simplification for ν half integer 
When   , the Matérn covariance can be written as a product of an exponential and a polynomial of order :

which gives:
 for : 
 for : 
 for :

The Gaussian case in the limit of infinite ν 
As , the Matérn covariance converges to the squared exponential covariance function

Taylor series at zero and spectral moments 
The behavior for  can be obtained by the following Taylor series (reference is needed, the formula below leads to division by zero in case ):

When defined, the following spectral moments can be derived from the Taylor series:

See also
 Radial basis function

References

Geostatistics
Spatial analysis
Covariance and correlation